Platyedra piceicoma is a moth of the family Gelechiidae. It was described by Edward Meyrick in 1931. It is found in Cameroon.

References

Moths described in 1931
Pexicopiini